This is a list of people with the surname Carey.

Sports people
 Alan Carey (canoeist) (born 1968), Irish sprint canoeist
 Annabelle Carey (born 1989), New Zealand swimmer
 Ashley Carey (born 1969), Australian field hockey player
 Beth Carey (born 1990), Australian volleyball player
 Betty Lowman Carey (1914–2011), Canadian rower
 Bob Carey (racing driver) (1904–1933), American race car driver
 Chelsea Carey (born 1984), Canadian curler
 Dan Carey (curler) (born 1954), Canadian curler
 Dan Carey (lacrosse) (born 1982), Canadian lacrosse player
 Denis Carey (athlete) (1872–1947), Irish field & track athlete, born in Limerick
 Eddie Carey (born 1960), American sprinter
 Kenneth Carey (1893–1981), American Olympic sailor
 Lance Carey (born 1945), Canadian field hockey player
 Michelle Carey (athlete) (born 1981), Irish athlete,  born in Dublin
 Ray Carey (born 1986), Irish sportsman, born in Co Cork
 Ray Carey (swimmer) (born 1973), American competition swimmer
 Sheila Carey (born 1946), English athlete, maiden name Sheila Janet Taylor
 Walter Carey (1875–1955), South African rugby union player and Bishop of Bloemfontein

American Football
 Bob Carey (American football) (1930–1988), American NFL football player
 Dana Carey (1903–1976), American football player
 Don Carey (American football official) (born 1947), American NFL official
 Don Carey (cornerback) (born 1987), American football player
 Emerson Carey (1906–1983), American football player
 Joe Carey (American football) (1895–1962), American NFL football player
 Ka'Deem Carey (born 1992), American footballer for Chicago Bears
 Mike Carey (American football) (born 1949), American football official
 Richard Carey (American football) (born 1968), American NFL football player
 Rod Carey (born 1971), American football player and coach
 Tim Carey (born 1975), American football player
 Vernon Carey (born 1981), American footballer for Miami Dolphins

Australian Rules football
 Bert Carey (1905–1994), Australian rules footballer
 Bill Carey (footballer) (1905–1973), Australian rules footballer
 George Carey (footballer) (born 1943), Australian rules footballer
 Harry Carey (footballer) (1916–1991), Australian rules footballer
 Peter Carey (Australian rules footballer) (born 1954), Australian rules player for Glenelg
 Peter Carey (umpire), Australian rules football umpire
 Stefan Carey (born 1976), Australian rules footballer
 Stephen Carey (born 1959), Australian rules footballer
 Tom Carey (footballer) (1941–2009), Australian rules footballer
 Wayne Carey (born 1971), Australian rules footballer

Baseball
 Andy Carey (1931–2011), American baseball player
 Mary Carey (baseball) (1925–1977), American professional baseball player
 Max Carey (1890–1976), American center fielder in Major League Baseball
 P. J. Carey (1953–2012), American baseball player, manager and official
 Paul Carey (baseball) (born 1968), American baseball player, brother of Jim Carey
 Roger Carey (1865–1895), American baseball player
 Scoops Carey (baseball) (1870–1916), American baseball player
 Tom Carey (second baseman) (1906–1970), American baseball player
 Tom Carey (shortstop) (1846–1906), American baseball player

Basketball
 Harvey Carey (born 1979), Filipino-American basketball player
 Jamie Carey (born 1981), American basketball player
 Mike Carey (basketball) (born 1958), American basketball coach
 Vernon Carey Jr. (born 2001), American basketball player and son of Vernon

Cricket
 Alex Carey (cricketer) (born 1991), Australian cricketer
 Christopher Carey (born 1973), English cricketer
 Paul Carey (cricketer) (1920–2009), English cricketer
 Thomas Carey (cricketer) (1903–1966), American-born Irish cricketer

Football
 Brian Carey (born 1968), Irish football manager and player, born in Cork
 Chuck Carey (born 1953), American soccer player
 Graham Carey (born 1989), Irish footballer
 Johnny Carey (1919–1995), Irish footballer, born in Dublin, captain of Manchester United & Republic of Ireland
 Louis Carey (born 1977), English footballer
 Peter Carey (English footballer) (born 1933), English footballer
 Shaun Carey (born 1976), English footballer

Gaelic sports
 Catriona Carey (born 1977), Irish field hockey and camogie player
 Ciarán Carey (born 1970), Irish hurling star, born in Co Limerick
 D. J. Carey (born 1970), Irish hurling star, born in Co Kilkenny
 Jarlath Carey (1932–2006), Irish Gaelic footballer
 Johnny Carey (Gaelic footballer) (born 1945), Irish Gaelic footballer
 Martin Carey (born 1974), Irish hurler
 Sean Carey (Gaelic footballer) (born 1989), Irish sportsman, Co Tipperary

Ice Hockey
 George Carey (ice hockey) (1892–1974), Scottish-Canadian ice hockey right winger
 Greg Carey (ice hockey) (born 1990), Canadian ice hockey player
 Jim Carey (ice hockey) (born 1974), American goaltender, born in Massachusetts
 Matt Carey (born 1992), Canadian ice hockey player
 Paul Carey (ice hockey) (born 1988), American ice hockey player

Actors
 Alycia Debnam-Carey (born 1993), Australian actress
 Anita Carey (born 1948), British actress born in Halifax, Yorkshire
 Clare Carey (born 1967), Rhodesian born actress
 Denis Carey (actor) (1909–1986), British/Irish actor brother of cinematographer Patrick
 Drew Carey (born 1958), American actor, comedian and game show host
 Emily Carey (born 2003), British actress
 George P. Carey (1852–1909), Australian actor and manager
 Greg Carey (voice actor), Australian-born voice actor
 Harry Carey (actor) (1878–1847), American actor, born in New York; classic 'Cowboy' films
 Harry Carey Jr. (1921–2012), American actor, son of Harry, appeared in 'Westerns'
 Joyce Carey (1898–1993), stage name of English actress born Joyce Lawrence
 Leonard Carey (1887–1977), English actor
 Mary Carey (actress) (born 1980), American pornographic actress
 Lynn Carey (born 1946), American singer and actress
 Macdonald Carey (1913–1994), American actor
 Michele Carey (1942–2018), American television and film actress
 Olive Carey (1896–1988), American film and television actress
 Philip Carey (1925–2009), American film actor, born Eugene Joseph Carey
 Richenda Carey (born 1948), English actress, born in Gloucestershire
 Ron Carey (actor) (1935–2007), American film and television actor
 Timothy Carey (1929–1994), American actor

Musicians
 Bruce Carey (1876–1960), Canadian singer and choral conductor
 Clive Carey (1883–1968), British singer and composer
 Dan Carey (record producer) (born 1969), English record producer
 Danny Carey (born 1961), American drummer of progressive rock band Tool
 Denis Carey (composer), Irish composer and musician, born in Tipperary
 Gina Carey, American filmmaker and singer
 Ian Carey (born 1975), American musician and record producer, born in Maryland
 Jack Carey (1889–1934), American jazz musician
 Kyle Carey (born 1988), Celtic Americana musical artist
 Mariah Carey (born 1969), American singer–songwriter, record producer and actress
 Mutt Carey (1891–1948), American jazz trumpeter from New Orleans
 Pat Carey (musician) (born 1960), Canadian blues musician
 Percy Carey (born 1970), American hip hop artist and comic book writer
 Rick Carey (singer) (born 1977), Bahamian music producer, singer and musician
 S. Carey, American folk musician, from Wisconsin
 Todd Carey, American musician and singer

Politicians
 Carleton Carey, American politician
 David M. Carey (1889-1963), American politician
 de Vic Carey (born 1940), Guernsey politician
 Donal Carey (born 1937), Irish politician from Co Clare
 Edmond Carey (1883–1943), Irish politician
 Edward Carey (1832–1908), Canadian gold prospector and politician
 Hugh Carey (1919–2011), Irish-American politician, New York governor
 Jon Carey (born 1946), Canadian politician
 Joseph Carey (Canadian politician) (c. 1829–1910), Canadian surveyor and mayor of Vancouver, B. C.
 William Carey (politician) (1887–1928), Australian politician

Other people
 Alan C. Carey (born 1962), American military aviation author and historian
 Alex Carey (writer) (1922–1987), Australian writer and social psychologist
 Alice Ross Carey (1948–2013), American architect
 Alvin P. Carey (1916–1944), American soldier and Medal of Honor winner
 André Isidore Carey (1790–?), French ballet dancer
 Anne Carey, American media producer
 Arthur Carey (1822–1844), English-American Episcopal priest
 Babe Carey, a fictional American soap opera character
 Benedict Carey (born 1960), American journalist and health writer
 Bill Carey (songwriter) (1916–2004), American songwriter
 Bridget Carey (born 1984), American journalist
 Brycchan Carey (born 1967), British academic and writer
 Catherine Carey (c. 1524–1569), sister of Henry Carey, 1st Baron Hunsdon
 Catherine A. Carey (born 1945), Clerk of the New York State Assembly 1975–1984
 Charles F. Carey Jr. (1915–1945), American soldier and Medal of Honor winner
 Charles James Carey (1838–1891), Royal Navy officer
 Chase Carey (born 1954), Irish-American businessperson
 Chris Carey, British educator
 Constantine Phipps Carey (1835–1906), British army officer
 Diane Carey (born 1954), American fiction writer
 Douglas Carey, Anglican priest
 Duane G. Carey (born 1957), American astronaut, born in Minnesota
 Dwayne Carey-Hill, American animation director
 Edmund Carey (c. 1558–1637), English MP
 Edward Carey (novelist) (born 1970), English novelist
 Eleanor Carey (c. 1495 – after 1528), English nun
 Eleanor Carey (actress) (1852–1915), in Australia and America
 Elijah John Carey (1876–1916), New Zealand writer, trade unionist and soldier
 Elizabeth Carey (social activist) (1835–1920), Canadian homemaker and social activist
 Elizabeth Carey, Lady Berkeley (1576–1635), English courtier and arts patron
 Ernestine Gilbreth Carey (1908–2006), American author, born in New York
 Frank Reginald Carey (1912–2004), English World War II fighter ace
 Gabrielle Carey (born 1959), Australian writer
 Galen Carey, American evangelical leader
 George Carey (born 1935), English Anglican priest, Archbishop of Canterbury
 Sir George Carey (c. 1541–1616), English MP for Canterbury
 George Carey, 2nd Baron Hunsdon (1547–1603), English soldier and MP for Hertfordshire and Hampshire
 George Carey (filmmaker) (born 1943), British documentary filmmaker and television journalist
 George Glas Sandeman Carey (1867–1948), British World War I general
 George Jackson Carey (1822–1872), British Army officer
 George R. Carey (1851–1906), American inventor
 George Saville Carey (1743–1807), entertainer and miscellaneous writer
 George W. Carey (1845–1924), American physician
 Henry Carey, 1st Baron Hunsdon (1526–1596), son of William Carey and Mary Boleyn
 Henry Carey, 1st Earl of Dover (c. 1580–1666), Royalist Colonel in the English Civil War
 Henry Carey, 2nd Earl of Monmouth (1595–1661), English nobleman
 Henry Carey (writer) (1687–1743), English poet
 Henry Charles Carey (1793–1879), Irish-American economist, son of Mathew Carey
 Henry Ernest Carey (1874–1964), British-born Australian public servant
 Hilary Carey (born 1957), Australian religious historian
 Hugh Carey (soldier) (1840–1886), Irish born Union soldier and winner of Medal of Honor
 Ida Harriet Carey (1891–1982), New Zealand artist and teacher
 Isiah Carey (born 1970), American broadcast journalist
 Jack Carey (dancer) (1927–2013), American swing dancer
 Jacqueline Carey (born 1964), American fantasy novelist
 Jacqueline Carey (novelist born 1954) (born 1954), American novelist
 Jahleel Brenton Carey (1847–1883), from the Guernsey family, soldier in controversial Zulu War incident 
 James Carey (1845–1883), Irish terrorist leader and Informer, born in Dublin
 James Carey (Medal of Honor) (1844 or 1847–1913), Irish born U.S. seaman
 James B. Carey (1911–1973, Irish-American labor union leader
 James J. Carey (born 1939), United States Navy admiral
 James L. Carey (1839–1919), American Civil War winner of Medal of Honor
 James W. Carey (1934–2006), American communications theorist
 Janet Lee Carey (born 1954), American college professor and writer
 Jennifer Davis Carey, American government official
 Joe Carey (born 1975), Irish politician from the Co Clare family
 John Carey, 2nd Earl of Dover (1608–1677), English peer
 John Carey, 3rd Baron Hunsdon (died 1617), English peer and politician
 John Carey (blessed) (died 1594), Irish Catholic martyr, born in Dublin
 John Carey (Celticist), American scholar specialising in Celtic studies
 John Carey (classical scholar) (1756–1826), Irish writer and teacher, born in Dublin
 John Carey (congressman) (1792–1875), American politician, after whom the town in Ohio is named
 John Carey (courtier) (c. 1491–1552), courtier to King Henry VIII
 John Carey (critic) (born 1934), British writer and academic
 John Carey (journalist) (born 1960), Irish sportswriter
 John Carey (martyr) (died 1594), Irish Catholic martyr
 John Carey (Ohio state legislator) (born 1959), Republican legislator
 John Carey (Wisconsin legislator) (1839–?), Democratic legislator
 John L. Carey (died 1852), American newspaper editor
 Archibald Carey Jr. (1908–1981), American lawyer, politician and clergyman
 Joseph M. Carey (1845–1924), American senator and Governor of Wyoming
 Joseph W. Carey (1859–1937), Irish artist
 Josie Carey (1930–2004), stage name of Pennsylvania born Josephine Vicari, children's television presenter
 Kenneth Carey (bishop) (1908–1979), Anglican bishop
 Kevin Carey (born 1970), American education writer and analyst
 Kieran Carey (1933–2007), Irish hurling star, born in Co Tipperary
 Leeanne Carey (born 1959), Australian neuroscientist
 Maggie Carey (born c. 1975), American director and screenwriter
 Leslie I. Carey (August 3, 1895 – June 17, 1984), American sound recordist
 Malachy Carey (1956–1992), Irish activist, Provisional IRA & Sinn Féin, born in Co. Antrim
 Marge Carey (c. 1938–2012), English trade unionist
 Mary Carey, Lady Carey (c. 1609–c. 1680), British author of poems and meditations
 Mary Virginia Carey (1925–1994), American writer
 Mary Carey (c. 1499/1500–1543), surname before marriage was Mary Boleyn. Sister of Anne Boleyn
 Mathew Carey (1760–1839), Irish nationalist and Philadelphia publisher, born in Dublin
 Maude Carey (1888–1950), Falklands Islands postmaster
 Michael Carey (priest) (1913–1985), from the Guernsey, Channel Island family, Anglican clergyman
 Michael Carey (United States Air Force officer) (born 1960), American officer
 Mike Carey (politician) (born 1971), American politician from Ohio
 Mike Carey (writer) (born 1959), Liverpool born comic book writer
 Nessa Carey, English epigenetics author
 Nuala Carey (born 1977), Irish radio weather presenter
 Pat Carey (born 1947), Irish politician, born in Co Kerry
 Patrick Carey (cinematographer) (1916–1996), British/Irish film maker
 Paul Carey (broadcaster) (1928–2016), American radio broadcaster and sports announcer
 Paul Carey (politician) (1962–2001), American politician, son of Hugh Carey
 Pelham Carey, English courtier
 Peter Carey (historian) (born 1948), British historian
 Peter Carey (novelist) (born 1943), Australian prize-winning novelist
 Philip J. Carey (1918–1996), American politician and judge
 Rea Carey (born 1966), American LGBT rights activist
 Richard Carey (judge) (died 1789), American judge from Virginia
 Richard Carey (politician) (1929–2013), American politician from Maine
 Richard Adams Carey (born 1951), American writer
 Richelle Carey (born 1976), American TV news reporter
 Rick Carey (born 1963), American competition swimmer
 Robert Carey, 1st Earl of Monmouth (c. 1560–1639), son of 1st Baron Hunsdon, 
 Robert Carey (British Army officer) (1821–1883), from the Guernsey, Channel Islands family
 Robert Carey (died 1587) (c. 1515–1587), English MP
 Robert Carey (gangster) (1894–1932), American criminal
 Robert D. Carey (1878–1937), American politician
 Robert T. Carey, American Whig legislator from Wisconsin
 Ron Carey (labor leader) (1936–2008), American labor organiser
 Ron Carey (Minnesota politician), American politician
 Rosa Nouchette Carey (1840–1909), English children's author, born in London's East End
 Sabine Carey (born 1974), German political scientist
 Sam Carey, American Old West outlaw
 Samuel Warren Carey (1911–2002), Australian geologist
 Sarah Carey, Irish columnist and broadcaster
 Sas Carey (born 1945), American film director and author
 Seamus Carey, American philosopher and academic
 Susan Carey (born 1942), American psychologist
 Tanith Carey, British journalist
 Thomas Carey (Australian politician) (1832 or 1833–1884), Irish emigrant and surveyor
 Thomas Carey (baritone) (1931–2002), American opera singer
 Thomas Carey (English politician) (died 1634), English MP, son of Robert Carey, 1st Earl of Monmouth
 Tony Carey (born 1953), American composer, singer/songwriter
 Victor Carey (1871–1957), from the Guernsey family, Bailiff of Guernsey during WWII
 William Carey (Bailiff of Guernsey) (1853–1915), Bailiff of Guernsey
 William Carey (bishop) (1769–1846), English churchman
 William Carey (courtier) (c. 1500–1528), from West Country family, married to Mary Boleyn
 William Carey (missionary) (1761–1834), English Baptist missionary and botanist
 William D. Carey (1916–1998), American publisher
 William P. Carey (1930–2012), American philanthropist and businessman, born in Maryland
 William Paulet Carey (1759–1839), Irish art critic and publicist, born in Dublin
 William R. Carey (1806–1836), Virginian Captain, killed at the Battle of the Alamo

See also
 Cary (surname), a similar name
 List of people with surname Carrey, a similar name
 Alycia Debnam-Carey
 

Carey
Carey